Brasel is a surname. Notable people with the surname include:

Nancy E. Brasel (born 1969), American judge
Sean Brasel, American chef and restaurant owner

See also
Brasey